Upton is an unincorporated community in western Texas County, Missouri, United States. The community is located on a ridge top (elevation 1430 ft.) approximately one mile east of the West Fork Roubidoux Creek.  It is located about ten miles west of Houston on Missouri Route FF.

A post office called Upton was established in 1907, and remained in operation until 1975. The community has the name of Osias Upton, a pioneer citizen.

References

Unincorporated communities in Texas County, Missouri
Unincorporated communities in Missouri